Urbenville is a rural village in northern New South Wales, Australia.

Urbenville has a new hospital which services the region along with an aged care nursing home.

The bank in the small town is heritage listed. Land surrounding the area is being planted with trees to be cut down for furniture. The town was established around 1860 when there was a gold rush nearby. Urbenville Post Office opened on 1 April, 1910.

Forestry, corn and soya crops and cattle raising are the main industries in the area. Four-wheel drive and both on & off-road motorcycle enthusiasts are users of the many nearby state forests and national parks.

Media 
Urbenville is served by the Border Districts Community Radio Station 89.7 Ten FM which is transmitted from a 4 kW transmitter located on Mount Mackenzie, Tenterfield.

References

External links
 SMH: Urbenville
 Northern Rivers Geology Blog - Urbenville

Towns in New South Wales
Towns in New England (New South Wales)